Allan Edwards may refer to:

Allan Edwards (footballer) (born 1957), Australian rules footballer
Allan Edwards (Australian cricketer) (1921–2019), Australian cricketer
Allan Edwards (New Zealand cricketer) (1920–1942), New Zealand cricketer
Allan Roy Edwards (1937–1999), Canadian ice hockey player

See also
Alan Edwards (disambiguation)
Allen Edwards (disambiguation)
Al Edwards (disambiguation)